National Agricultural Cooperative Marketing Federation of India Ltd (NAFED) is  an apex organization of marketing cooperatives for agricultural produce in India, National Agricultural Cooperative Marketing Federation of India Ltd, Official website. It was founded on the birthday of Mahatma Gandhi on 2 October 1958 to promote the trade of agricultural produce and forest resources across the nation. It is registered under Multi State Co-operative Societies Act. NAFED is now one of the largest procurement as well as marketing agencies for agricultural products in India. With its headquarters in New Delhi, NAFED has four regional offices at Delhi, Mumbai, Chennai and Kolkata, apart from 28 zonal offices in capitals of states and important cities.

NAFED is the nodal agency to implement price stabilization measures under "Operation Greens" which aims to double the farmers' income by 2022. NAFED along with FCI with proactive role of state governments also physically procures oilseeds, pulses and copra under the Price Support Scheme (PSS) which in turn is under the umbrella scheme of PM-AASHA. In 2008, it established, National Spot Exchange, a Commodities exchange as a joint venture of Financial Technologies (India) Ltd. (FTIL).

See also
 Tamil Nadu State Agricultural Marketing Board (TNSAMB)

References

External links
 National Agricultural Cooperative Marketing Federation of India, Official website

Organizations established in 1958
Organisations based in Delhi
Cooperative federations
Agricultural marketing cooperatives
Agricultural marketing in India
Ministry of Agriculture & Farmers' Welfare
1958 establishments in Delhi
Agricultural cooperatives in India